Norman's Cay Airport  is an airport serving Norman's Cay, one of the Exuma Islands in The Bahamas. It was known for cocaine drug smuggling from Colombia to the United States under Carlos Lehder.

Facilities

Landing Fee 
Though not published, there is a $162.80 (USD) or more  landing fee at Norman's Cay, depending on aircraft size.  The fee is communicated verbally by Airport Staff

References

External links
 

Airports in the Bahamas
Exuma